Paul Nguyễn Văn Hoà (20 July 1931 – 14 February 2017) was a Vietnamese Roman Catholic bishop.

Ordained to the priesthood in 1959, Nguyễn Văn Hoà served as of the Roman Catholic Diocese of Nha Trang from 1975 to 2009.

He was the composer of Vietnamese-language Mass "Seraphim", which is written in 1960.

See also
Catholic Church in Vietnam

References

1931 births
2017 deaths
21st-century Roman Catholic bishops in Vietnam
20th-century Roman Catholic bishops in Vietnam